Rowing at the 1984 Summer Olympics in Los Angeles, California, United States featured 14 events in total, for both men and women. Events were held at Lake Casitas.

Due to the Eastern Bloc boycott of these Olympics, some of the strongest rowing nations like East Germany, the USSR or Bulgaria were not present. However, this boycott gave an opportunity to Romania, which was one of the few eastern European countries to come to the Games, going on to dominate in women's sports, winning 5 gold medals in 6 events. Both Canada (gold) and USA (silver) had beaten the reigning (boycotting) two-time Olympic champions from East Germany in the men's 8 twice at the Lucerne pre-olympic regatta.

Steve Redgrave won his first of five consecutive gold medals. Elisabeta Oleniuc, later known as Elisabeta Lipă, also won her first gold medal. Twenty years later she won her fifth gold medal in the 2004 Summer Olympics in Athens.

The quadruple sculls events, as in 1976 and 1980, were held without coxswain for men and with coxswain for women.

Medal summary

Men's events

Women's events

Medal table

See also
 Rowing at the Friendship Games
 Rowers at the 1984 Summer Olympics

References

External links
Official Olympic Report

 
1984 Summer Olympics events
1984
Summer Olympics